The Grace College of Business and Computer Science (GCBC) is a private college located in Addis Ababa, Ethiopia. It was established in 2001.

GCBC is a member of the Ethiopian Private Colleges Association. It has been accredited to operate in various fields of study by the Ministry of Education, Region 14 Education Bureau, Arada and Kirkos Education Departments.

References

External links
 

Universities and colleges in Ethiopia
Educational institutions established in 2001
2001 establishments in Ethiopia